is a Japanese short track speed skater. He competed at the 2014 Winter Olympics in the men's 1000 metres and the men's 1500 metres events. He also competed at the 2018 Winter Olympics in the men's 1000 metres and men's 5000 metre relay.

External links
Ryosuke Sakazume at ISU

References 

1990 births
Living people
Japanese male short track speed skaters
Olympic short track speed skaters of Japan
Short track speed skaters at the 2014 Winter Olympics
Short track speed skaters at the 2018 Winter Olympics
Asian Games medalists in short track speed skating
Asian Games silver medalists for Japan
Asian Games bronze medalists for Japan
Short track speed skaters at the 2011 Asian Winter Games
Short track speed skaters at the 2017 Asian Winter Games
Medalists at the 2011 Asian Winter Games
Medalists at the 2017 Asian Winter Games
21st-century Japanese people